Artemisia absinthium (wormwood, grand wormwood, absinthe, absinthium, absinthe wormwood, mugwort, wermout, wermud, wormit, wormod) is a species of Artemisia, native to  North Africa and temperate regions of Eurasia, and widely naturalized in Canada and the northern United States. It is grown as an ornamental plant and is used as an ingredient in the spirit absinthe and some other alcoholic beverages.

Etymology
Artemisia comes from Ancient Greek ἀρτεμισία, from Ἄρτεμις (Artemis). In Hellenistic culture, Artemis was a goddess of the hunt, and protector of the forest and children. The name absinthum comes from the Ancient Greek ἀψίνθιον, meaning the same. An alternative derivation is that the genus was named after Queen Artemisia, who was the wife and sister of Mausolus, ruler of Caria.
The word "wormwood" may come from Middle English wormwode or wermode. Webster's Third New International Dictionary attributes the etymology to Old English wermōd (compare with German Wermut and the derived drink vermouth), which the OED (s.v.) marks as "of obscure origin". Some sources state the word "wormwood" comes from the ancient use of the plant as antihelminthic (expelling parasitic worms from the body by either stunning or killing them), documented in Natural History by Pliny (first century AD).

Description
A. absinthium is a herbaceous perennial plant with fibrous roots.

Leaves are spirally arranged, greenish-grey colored above, white below, covered with silky silvery-white trichomes, and bearing minute oil-producing glands. The uppermost leaves can be both simple and sessile (without a petiole).

Flowers are pale yellow, tubular, and clustered in spherical bent-down heads (capitula), which are in turn clustered in leafy and branched panicles. Flowering occurs from early summer to early autumn; pollination is anemophilous. The fruit is a small achene. Seed dispersal occurs by gravity.

A. absinthium grows naturally on uncultivated arid ground, on rocky slopes, and at the edge of footpaths and fields. Although once relatively common, it is becoming increasingly rare in the UK, where it has recently been suggested to be an archaeophyte rather than a true native.

Cultivation

The plant can easily be cultivated in dry soil. It should be planted under bright exposure in fertile, midweight soil. It prefers soil rich in nitrogen, and can be propagated by ripened cuttings taken in spring or autumn in temperate climates, or by seeds in nursery beds. Growing the plant with others tends to stunt their growth; accordingly, it is not considered to be a good companion plant. A. absinthium also self-seeds generously. It is naturalised in some areas away from its native range, including much of North America and Kashmir Valley of India.

This plant, and its cultivars 'Lambrook Mist' and 'Lambrook Silver' have gained the Royal Horticultural Society's Award of Garden Merit. These two short cultivars are very similar and more silver than typical British absinthium material and probably derive from southern Europe. 'Lambrook Silver' is the earliest of these cultivars, having been selected in the late 1950s by Margery Fish, who developed the garden at East Lambrook Manor. 'Lambrook Mist' was selected about 30 years later by Andrew Norton, a subsequent owner of the garden. Both gained their Awards of Garden Merit during the RHS Artemisia Trial 1991–3.

Cultivar 'Silver Ghost' is a taller, silver plant, which flowers much later (August–September) than typical absinthium (June–July) in UK, so holds its silver appearance for longer. This and a more feathery-leaved cultivar 'Persian Lace' were selected by National Collection Holder John Twibell in the 1990s.

Constituents
Wormwood herb contains bitter substances from the group of sesquiterpene lactones; absinthin, at 0.20 to 0.28%, is the main component of these bitter substances. Essential oils make up 0.2 to 0.8% and contain (-) - thujone, (+) - isothujone, thujyl alcohol and its esters, chamazulene and other mono- and sesquiterpenes. In Bailen et al 2013 and Gonzalez-Coloma et al 2013 the Gonzalez-Coloma group discovered a chemotype that does not produce β-thujone but does contain terpenoids not seen elsewhere.

Uses
It is an ingredient in the spirit absinthe, and is used for flavouring in some other spirits and wines, including bitters, bäsk, vermouth, and pelinkovac. As medicine, it is used for dyspepsia, as a bitter to counteract poor appetite, for various infectious diseases, Crohn's disease, and IgA nephropathy.

In the Middle Ages, wormwood was used to spice mead, and in Morocco, it is used with tea, called sheeba.

Wormwood was traditionally relatively common as a bittering spice in farmhouse brewing in Denmark, and to some extent Estonia. In 18th-century England, wormwood was sometimes used instead of hops in beer.

Wormwood clippings and cuttings are added to chicken nesting boxes to repel lice, mites, and fleas. Bailen et al. 2013 and Gonzalez-Coloma et al. 2013 find the unique terpenoids of the Gonzalez-Coloma chemotype make this strain especially promising for insect control.  a company named EcoflorAgro is investing heavily into increasing the planted area of this strain, hoping to commercialize it to a degree attempted  but never achieved due to unreliable supply  for other botanical insecticides before.

Toxicity
Most chemotypes of A. absinthium contain (−)-α- and/or (+)-β-thujone, though some do not. (−)-α-Thujone by itself is a GABA receptor antagonist that can cause convulsions and death when administered in large amounts to animals and humans. However, there is only one case of documented toxicity of wormwood involving a 31-year-old man who drank 10 mL of steam-distilled volatile oil of wormwood, wrongly believing it was absinthe liqueur. Medicinal extracts of wormwood have not been shown to cause seizure or other adverse effects at usual doses. Thujones have not been shown to be the cause of excessive doses' toxicity for any kind of wormwood extracts, including absinthe.

Folk names

A. absinthium has many folk names: absint-alsem (Dutch), absinth, absinthe, absinthium vulgate, Absinthkraut, agenjo, ajenjo común, artenheil, assenzio vero (Italian), Bitterer Beifuß, botrys, eberreis, echter Wermut, gengibre verde (Spanish), Heilbitter, green muse, grüne Fee, la fée verte, Magenkraut, Shih (Arabic), Shiba (Morocco), Schweizertee, wermod (Saxon), wor-mod (Old English), malört (Swedish) and others.

Cultural history
In the Bible, the Book of Revelation tells of a star named Wormwood that plummets to Earth and turns a third of the rivers and fountains of waters bitter.

Nicholas Culpeper insisted that wormwood was the key to understanding his 1651 book The English Physitian. Richard Mabey describes Culpeper's entry on this bitter-tasting plant as "stream-of-consciousness" and "unlike anything else in the herbal", and states that it reads "like the ramblings of a drunk". Culpeper biographer Benjamin Woolley suggests the piece may be an allegory about bitterness, as Culpeper had spent his life fighting the Establishment, and had been imprisoned and seriously wounded in battle as a result.

William Shakespeare referred to wormwood in Romeo and Juliet: Act 1, Scene 3. Juliet's childhood nurse said, "For I had then laid wormwood to my dug" meaning that the nurse had weaned Juliet, then aged three, by using the bitter taste of wormwood on her nipple.

John Locke, in his 1689 book titled An Essay Concerning Human Understanding, used wormwood as an example of bitterness, writing, "For a child knows as certainly before it can speak the difference between the ideas of sweet and bitter (i.e. that sweet is not bitter), as it knows afterwards (when it comes to speak) that wormwood and sugarplums are not the same thing."

Edwin Arlington Robinson relates in a poem how Cliff Klingenhagen gave a guest a glass of wine while drinking a glass of wormwood himself. He concludes, "I have spent / Long time a-wondering when I shall be / As happy as Cliff Klingenhagen is."

References

External links

Biodiversity Heritage Library bibliography for Artemisia absinthium
Erowid Wormwood Vault- information on the use and preparation of wormwood, along with user experiences.
European Medicines Agency (4 March 2020). European Union herbal monograph on Artemisia absinthium L., herba, Amsterdam

absinthium
Absinthe
Medicinal plants of Africa
Medicinal plants of Asia
Medicinal plants of Europe
Plants described in 1753
Edible plants
Taxa named by Carl Linnaeus